Yangibozor is a town and seat of Yuqorichirchiq District in Tashkent Region in Uzbekistan.

References

Populated places in Tashkent Region
Urban-type settlements in Uzbekistan